Destruction '09 was a professional wrestling pay-per-view (PPV) event promoted by New Japan Pro-Wrestling (NJPW). The event took place on November 8, 2009, in Tokyo, at Ryōgoku Kokugikan. The event featured nine matches, three of which were contested for championships. The event featured outside participation from Consejo Mundial de Lucha Libre (CMLL) representative Místico and Hustle representative Tajiri. It was the third event under the Destruction name.

Production

Storylines
Destruction '09 featured nine professional wrestling matches that involved different wrestlers from pre-existing scripted feuds and storylines. Wrestlers portrayed villains, heroes, or less distinguishable characters in the scripted events that built tension and culminated in a wrestling match or series of matches.

Event
The event saw one title switch, when Místico lost the IWGP Junior Heavyweight Championship back to Tiger Mask, ending his three-month-long reign. The Total Nonstop Action Wrestling (TNA) tag team Team 3D (Brother Devon and Brother Ray) returned to NJPW at the event to make their first successful defense of the IWGP Tag Team Championship against the winners of the 2009 G1 Tag League, Bad Intentions (Giant Bernard and Karl Anderson), though the match ended in a double countout. In the main event Shinsuke Nakamura retained the IWGP Heavyweight Championship against Hiroshi Tanahashi.

Results

References

External links
The official New Japan Pro-Wrestling website

2009
2009 in professional wrestling
Events in Tokyo
November 2009 events in Japan
Professional wrestling in Tokyo